Colonel William Baume Capper CVO (6 February 1856 – 15 January 1934) was a British Army officer who became Commandant of the Royal Military College Sandhurst.

Military career
Capper was born on 6 February 1856 at Newbridge Hill, Bath, Somerset, his father William Copeland Capper having been in the Bengal Civil Service. Educated at Haileybury, Capper was commissioned into the 85th Regiment of Foot in 1876 and subsequently played cricket for Shropshire in 1882-83 and for Staffordshire. He became adjutant of the King's Shropshire Light Infantry in 1886. He served in the Second Anglo-Afghan War, in the 1882 Anglo-Egyptian War and in the Mahdist War in Sudan from 1884 to 1885. He was Commandant of the Royal Military College Sandhurst from 1907 to 1911 and then served in World War I, following which he was made a CVO in 1919.

Family
In 1888 he married Helen Margaret Parry; they had two daughters. He died aged 77 in January 1934 at Newbridge Hill, Bath.

He had three brothers all who served in the Army, one was Major-General Sir Thompson Capper KCMG, CB, DSO who was killed in World War I, and another was Major-General Sir John Edward Capper.

References

 

1856 births
1934 deaths
Military personnel from Somerset
Commanders of the Royal Victorian Order
People educated at Haileybury and Imperial Service College
58th Regiment of Foot officers
Commandants of Sandhurst
King's Shropshire Light Infantry officers
British Army personnel of the Anglo-Egyptian War
British Army personnel of the Mahdist War
British Army personnel of the Second Anglo-Burmese War
British Army personnel of World War I